Little Mitton is a civil parish in Ribble Valley, Lancashire, England.  It contains two listed buildings that are recorded in the National Heritage List for England.  Of these, one is at Grade II*, the middle grade, and the other is at Grade II, the lowest grade.  The listed buildings are a former country house, later converted into a hotel, and a bridge crossing the River Ribble.

Key

Buildings

References

Citations

Sources

Lists of listed buildings in Lancashire
Buildings and structures in Ribble Valley